, provisional designation , is a stony asteroid on an eccentric orbit, classified as near-Earth object and potentially hazardous asteroid of the Athen group, approximately  in diameter. It was discovered on 18 March 2002, by astronomers with the Lincoln Near-Earth Asteroid Research at the Lincoln Laboratory's Experimental Test Site near Socorro, New Mexico, in the United States. The Q-type asteroid has a rotation period of 6.2 hours.

Orbit and classification 

 is a member of the Athen group of asteroids. It orbits the Sun at a distance of 0.3–1.2 AU once every 8 months (243 days; semi-major axis of 0.76 AU). Its orbit has an eccentricity of 0.60 and an inclination of 20° with respect to the ecliptic. The body's observation arc begins with its official discovery observation at Socorro.

Close approaches 

Physical characteristics 

 has been characterized as an uncommon Q-type asteroid, that fall into the larger stony S-complex.

Rotation period 

In March 2016, a rotational lightcurve of this asteroid was obtained from photometric observations. Lightcurve analysis gave a rotation period of 6.231 hours with a brightness amplitude of 0.19 magnitude.

Diameter and albedo 

According to the survey carried out by the NEOWISE mission of NASA's Wide-field Infrared Survey Explorer,  measures between 1.552 and 1.682 kilometers in diameter and its surface has an albedo between 0.1426 and 0.202.

The Collaborative Asteroid Lightcurve Link assumes a stony standard albedo of 0.20 and calculates a diameter of 1.49 kilometers based on an absolute magnitude of 16.5.

Naming 

This minor planet was numbered by the MPC on 26 September 2007. As of 2018, it has not been named.

References

External links 
 List Of Aten Minor Planets (by designation), Minor Planet Center
 List of the Potentially Hazardous Asteroids (PHAs), Minor Planet Center
 PHA Close Approaches To The Earth, Minor Planet Center
 Asteroid Lightcurve Database (LCDB), query form (info )
 
 
 

163243
163243
163243
20020318